Anitra Eiding Ingalls is an American biogeochemist and oceanographer. In 2017, she was named an American Geophysical Union Outstanding Reviewer.

Life 
She graduated from Reed College and from Stony Brook University. She was a post-doctoral fellow at Pearson Lab. She was a researcher at  Lamont-Doherty Earth Observatory. She teaches at University of Washington. She attended Kavli Frontiers of Science symposia. She did research at the Simons Collaboration on Ocean Processes and Ecology.

She studies sulfur based organisms, and production of Vitamin B12 in the ocean.

Works

References

External links
Official website

American oceanographers
Stony Brook University alumni
Reed College alumni
Lamont–Doherty Earth Observatory people
University of Washington faculty
Biogeochemists
Women oceanographers
Year of birth missing (living people)
Living people